Jerry A. Stern (born January 11, 1955) is a former member of the Pennsylvania House of Representatives from the 80th District first elected in 1992.

Career
Prior to his election to the House, Stern was elected as Blair County Prothonotary and Clerk of Courts after serving as Deputy Prothonotary from 1982 to 1989.

In the Legislature, Stern has been appointed to the Subcommittee on Military and Veterans Facilities.  He also has served on the Agricultural and Rural Affairs and Children and Youth Committees.

Personal
Stern is a member of the Martinsburg Sportsmen's Association, Blair County Chamber of Commerce and Blair County Farm Bureau.  Stern also sits on the Board of Directors for Hollidaysburg American Legion Ambulance Service, Inc. Stern and his wife live in the Martinsburg area with their two children.

References

External links
Representative Stern's official web site
PA House profile

1955 births
Living people
People from Roaring Spring, Pennsylvania
Republican Party members of the Pennsylvania House of Representatives
Pennsylvania State University alumni
21st-century American politicians